Percy Baker can refer to:

 Percy Baker (archdeacon) (1871–1947), Archdeacon of Warrington
 Percy Baker (cricketer) (1874–1939), English cricketer
 Percy Baker (gymnast) (1880–1957), Welsh gymnast
 Edwin Percy Baker (1895–1990), English lawn and indoor bowler